Kardos is a Hungarian language occupational surname, which means "swordsman", derived from the Turkish word "kard", meaning a sword. Alternative spellings include Kardoš, Kardosh, and Kardossh. The name may refer to:

Dezider Kardoš (1914–1991), Slovak composer
Ferenc Kardos (1937–1999), Hungarian filmmaker
Gene Kardos (1899–1980), American musician
János Kardos (1801–1875), Hungarian writer
József Kardos (born 1960), Hungarian football player
Štefan Kardoš (born 1966), Slovene writer
Tivadar Kardos (1921–1998), Hungarian chess player

See also

Kardos, Hungary
Kardoskút, Hungary
Karlos (name)

Hungarian-language surnames